Donald "Flash" Gordon (July 17, 1920 – January 4, 2010) was an American naval aviator and flying ace, having shot down at least seven Japanese aircraft during World War II. He was a fighter pilot in the United States Navy and a recipient of the Distinguished Flying Cross.

Biography
Gordon's first recorded kill was during the Battle of the Santa Cruz Islands. Flying a Grumman F4F Wildcat and out of ammunition he flew straight towards a Nakajima B5N that had just launched a torpedo towards , forcing it into the ocean. Enterprise, despite being damaged in earlier attacks, was able to dodge the torpedo. On January 30, 1943, again flying a Wildcat and heading the Enterprise fighter group, nicknamed the 'Grim Reapers', Gordon shot down at least two Mitsubishi G4Ms who were heading for Enterprise and the damaged cruiser . Although G4M torpedoes sunk Chicago, only two out of eleven G4Ms survived the encounter with the Grim Reapers, the rest were shot down.

Quotation
I never had a dogfight. I usually got head on or tail on.  They never saw us coming. That's the way to fight a war.

See also

Battle 360° television series that aired on History (American TV channel)
List of World War II aces from the United States
Naval aviation

References

1920 births
2010 deaths
United States Navy pilots of World War II
American World War II flying aces
Aviators from Kansas
Recipients of the Air Medal
Recipients of the Distinguished Flying Cross (United States)